Dirk Maas (12 September 1659 – 25 December 1717), was a Dutch Golden Age landscape painter.

Biography
Maas was born and died in Haarlem. According to Houbraken he was first a pupil of Hendrick Mommers, a Haarlem painter of vegetable market scenes, and then took lessons from Nicolaes Berchem, who he probably met through Mommers.  Maas became a follower of Berchem's Italianate landscape painting. Eventually he took up with Jan van Huchtenburg, whereupon he devoted himself to painting horses.

According to the RKD he was first became a member of the Haarlem Guild of Saint Luke in 1678, and in 1690 he accompanied William III of England's army, where he painted the Battle of the Boyne first-hand. He was a pupil of Mommers, Berchem, and Huchtenburg who made prints, Italianate landscapes, and staffage for other painters. In 1697 he became a member of the Confrerie Pictura, though he seems to have remained active in Haarlem also.

References

 Watercolor of the Siege of Namur (1695) by Dirk Maas on Geheugen van Nederland

1659 births
1717 deaths
Dutch Golden Age painters
Dutch male painters
Artists from Haarlem
Painters from Haarlem
Painters from The Hague